The 2001 Copa América knockout stage was the elimination stage of the Copa América, following the group stage. It began on 22 July 2001 and consisted of the quarter-finals, the semi-finals, the third-place play-off, and the final held at Estadio El Campín on 29 July, in Bogotá. No extra time was to be played if any match in the final stages finished tied after regulation; the match would go straight to a penalty shoot-out.

All times are in local, Colombia Time (UTC−05:00).

Qualified teams
The top two placed teams from each of the three groups, plus the two best-placed third teams, qualified for the knockout stage.

Bracket

Quarter-finals

Chile v Mexico

Costa Rica v Uruguay

Colombia v Peru

Brazil v Honduras

Semi-finals

Mexico v Uruguay

Colombia v Honduras

Third-place match

Final

External links
2001 Copa América at RSSSF

Final stages
2001 in Peruvian football
2001 in Colombian football
2001 in Uruguayan football
2000–01 in Mexican football
2000–01 in Costa Rican football
2000–01 in Honduran football
Brazil at the 2001 Copa América
Chile at the 2001 Copa América